Richard Bright Canney (July 1852 – 17 June 1887) was an English-born cricketer and doctor who practised in New Zealand and Australia.

Born in Thanet in Kent, Canney arrived in New Zealand in January 1878. While working as a general practitioner in Wakefield, Canney was selected to captain the Nelson cricket team in its annual first-class match against Wellington in April 1878. He won the toss and, batting in the middle order, scored 7 and 15 – above-average scores in a match in which 40 wickets fell for 297 runs – and Nelson won by 85 runs. It was his only first-class cricket match.

He moved to Australia in the early 1880s and practised in Scone and then in Gunnedah, where he was highly regarded for his work among the poorer citizens. He married Ellen Sarah Rigney in Walcha in 1885.

In March 1887, after he had unsuccessfully operated on a 15-year-old girl at Breeza and she died, he was accused of malpractice. However, the jury not only cleared Canney of malpractice, but in fact commended him for his actions, "when he knew there was no likelihood of ever being recompensed for his trouble".

On Thursday 16 June 1887 Canney was thrown from his horse in Conadilly Street, Gunnedah, and suffered a fractured skull. He died of his injuries early the next morning.

References

External links
 
 

1852 births
1887 deaths
New Zealand cricketers
Nelson cricketers
People from Thanet (district)
English emigrants to New Zealand
English emigrants to Australia
Australian general practitioners
Deaths by horse-riding accident in Australia